Başaran is a village in the Beytüşşebap District of Şırnak Province in Turkey. The village is populated by Kurds of the Jirkî tribe and had a population of 734 in 2021.

The hamlets of Akağıl, Bademli and Tepebaşı is attached to Başaran.

References 

Villages in Beytüşşebap District
Kurdish settlements in Şırnak Province